USS Morning Light was a sailing ship acquired by the Union Navy during the American Civil War. She was used by the Navy to patrol navigable waterways of the Confederacy to prevent the South from trading with other countries.

Service history
Morning Light, an eight-gun ship, was built in 1853 by William Cramp & Sons in the Kensington section of Philadelphia; launched 15 August 1853; purchased by the Navy 2 September 1861 at New York City; and commissioned 21 November 1861 at New York Navy Yard, Acting Volunteer Lt. Henry T. Moore in command. After fitting out for combat, Morning Light sailed from New York to cruise the lower U.S. East Coast in search of Confederate privateers and blockade runners. Morning Light returned to New York, arriving 28 February 1862.
 
Assigned to Flag Officer David G. Farragut's West Gulf Blockading Squadron, Morning Light departed New York in March with provisions for ships in the Mississippi Sound area. By 27 May Morning Light was off Pensacola, Florida, performing blockade duties with sloop . On 19 June sloop , temporary tender for Morning Light, intercepted sloop Ventura, loaded with foodstuff for New Orleans, off Grant's Pass, Mobile Bay, Alabama.
 
Returning to Ship Island, Mississippi, in August, Morning Light left in November for Velasco, Texas. On 27 and 28 November, she sent several boat expeditions ashore to destroy the Confederate salt works at Cedar Lake. On 18 January 1863, Morning Light, Acting Master John Dillingham now in command, was ordered to blockade off Sabine Pass. Three days later two Confederate "cotton clad" steamers, Uncle Ben and Josiah H. Bell, with artillery and Texas infantry, attacked Morning Light and schooner  in a successful effort to destroy the blockade at Galveston, Texas. Due to the calm weather, neither Union sailing ship could evade the Confederate fire, and both were forced to strike their colors. Morning Light, left a riddled wreck, was taken by the Confederates 21 January and burned two days later.

References 

Ships of the Union Navy
Gunboats of the United States Navy
1853 ships
Shipwrecks of the American Civil War
Shipwrecks of the Texas coast
Shipwrecks in the Gulf of Mexico
Maritime incidents in January 1863
Ships built by William Cramp & Sons